Sorsogon's 2nd congressional district is one of the two congressional districts of the Philippines in the province of Sorsogon. It has been represented in the House of Representatives of the Philippines since 1916 and earlier in the Philippine Assembly from 1907 to 1916. The district consists of the municipalities of Barcelona, Bulan, Bulusan, Gubat, Irosin, Juban, Matnog, Prieto Diaz and Santa Magdalena. It was represented in the 19th Congress by Manuel L. Fortes Jr of the Nationalist People's Coalition (NPC).

Representation history

Election results

2022

2019

2016

2013

2010

See also
Legislative districts of Sorsogon

References

Congressional districts of the Philippines
Politics of Sorsogon
1907 establishments in the Philippines
Congressional districts of the Bicol Region
Constituencies established in 1907